Carl Kuhlmann (25 April 1899 – 18 July 1962) was a German stage and film actor. He played the role of Nathan Mayer Rothschild in the antisemitic historical film The Rothschilds (1940) which was made as an anti-Jewish, anti-British propaganda films during the Second World War.

Selected filmography
 La Habanera (1937)
 By a Silken Thread (1938)
 The Curtain Falls (1939)
 The Rothschilds (1940)
 Women Are Better Diplomats (1941)
 Vienna 1910 (1943)
 Nora (1944)
 Via Mala (1945)
 The Years Pass (1945)
 Trouble Backstairs (1949)

References

Bibliography
 Richards, Jeffrey. Visions of Yesterday. Routledge, 2014.

External links

1899 births
1962 deaths
Actors from Bremen
German male film actors
German male stage actors